Galearctus is a genus of slipper lobsters, comprising the following species:
Galearctus aurora (Holthuis, 1982)
Galearctus avulsus Yang, Chen & Chan, 2011
Galearctus kitanoviriosus (Harada, 1962)
Galearctus rapanus (Holthuis, 1993)
Galearctus timidus (Holthuis, 1960)
Galearctus umbilicatus (Holthuis, 1977)

References

Achelata
Taxa named by Lipke Holthuis